Anhammus dalenii is a species of beetle in the family Cerambycidae. It was described by Félix Édouard Guérin-Méneville in 1844 originally under the genus Monochamus. It is known from Malaysia, Java, and Sumatra.

Subspecies
 Anhammus dalenii borneensis deJong, 1942
 Anhammus dalenii dalenii (Guérin-Méneville, 1844)
 Anhammus dalenii malayanus Hayashi, 1975
 Anhammus dalenii tessellatus Heller, 1926

References

Lamiini
Beetles described in 1844